Kim Kuk-jin (born 5 January 1989) is a North Korean international football player. He last played for FC Wil in Switzerland.

Club career statistics

International goals
Goals for senior national team

References

External links
 Football.ch profile 

1989 births
Living people
Sportspeople from Pyongyang
North Korean footballers
North Korea international footballers
Expatriate footballers in Switzerland
FC Concordia Basel players
Pyongyang Sports Club players
North Korean expatriate footballers
North Korean expatriate sportspeople in Switzerland
2011 AFC Asian Cup players
FC Wil players
Footballers at the 2010 Asian Games
Association football midfielders
Asian Games competitors for North Korea